Bearna/Na Forbacha GAA is a Gaelic Athletic Association club located in the Barna and Furbo areas of County Galway, Ireland.  The club is exclusively concerned with hurling.

Honours
Galway Junior B Hurling Championship (1): 2010
Galway Junior 1 Hurling Championship (1): 2010
Connacht Junior Club Hurling Championship (1): 2010

References

External links
Official Club website

Gaelic games clubs in County Galway
Hurling clubs in County Galway